Carbon dioxide transmission rate (COTR) is the measurement of the amount of carbon dioxide gas that passes through a substance over a given period. It is mostly carried out on non-porous materials, where the mode of transport is diffusion, but there are a growing number of applications where the transmission rate also depends on flow through apertures of some description.

See also
 Moisture vapor transmission rate
 Permeation
 Oxygen transmission rate
Packaging

Further reading
 Yam, K. L., "Encyclopedia of Packaging Technology", John Wiley & Sons, 2009, 
 Massey, L. K., "Permeability Properties of Plastics and Elastomers", 2003, Andrew Publishing,

Standards
 ASTM D1434 - Standard Test Method for Determining Gas Permeability Characteristics of Plastic Film and Sheeting
 ASTM F1115 - Standard Test Method for Determining the Carbon Dioxide Loss of Beverage Containers
 ASTM F2476 - Test Method for the Determination of Carbon Dioxide Gas Transmission Rate (Co 2TR) Through Barrier Materials Using An Infrared Detector

Packaging